Vanilla moonii is an endangered vanilla species found only in Sri Lanka.

References

External links
  Culturesheet.org

moonii
Orchids of Sri Lanka
Endemic flora of Sri Lanka
Endangered plants